A community interest company (CIC, sometimes colloquially pronounced "kick" but also pronounced by its three letter abbreviation) is a type of company introduced by the United Kingdom government in 2005 under the Companies (Audit, Investigations and Community Enterprise) Act 2004, designed for social enterprises where there is a wish to use their profits and assets for the public good. CICs are intended to be easy to establish, with all the flexibility and certainty of the company form, but with some special features to ensure they are working for the benefit of the community. They are overseen by the Regulator of Community Interest Companies.

CICs have proved popular and some 10,000 were registered in the first ten years of the status being available.

Objectives
A community interest company is a business with primarily social objectives whose surpluses are principally reinvested for that purpose in the business or the community, rather than being driven by the need to maximize profit for shareholders and owners. CICs tackle a wide range of social and environmental issues and operate in all parts of the economy. By using business methods to achieve public good, it is believed that CICs have a distinct and valuable role to play in helping create a strong, sustainable and socially inclusive economy.

The community interest company emerged from many sources, often citing the absence in the UK of a company form for not-for-profit social enterprises similar to the public benefit corporation in the United States. One notable early proposal was advanced in 2001 by the Public Management Foundation in "The case for the public interest company", based on research supported by the Gulbenkian Foundation, Gordon Roddick, and the Office for Public Management.

CICs are diverse. They include social and community enterprises, social firms, mutual organizations such as co-operatives, and large-scale organizations operating locally, regionally, nationally, or internationally.

Legal forms
CICs must be limited companies of one form or another. A CIC cannot be a charity, an IPS or an unincorporated organization.

Limited liability companies that do not have charitable status find it difficult to ensure that their assets are dedicated to public benefit. There is no simple, clear way of locking the support of such a company to a public benefit purpose, other than applying for charitable status. The community interest company is intended to meet this need.

When a CIC is requested, the CIC regulator considers whether the application meets the criteria to become a CIC. If satisfied, the regulator advises the Registrar in Companies House who, provided that all the documents are in order, will issue a certificate of incorporation as a CIC.

A charity can convert to a CIC with the consent of the Charity Commission. In so doing, it will lose its charitable status, including tax advantages. A charity may own a CIC, in which case the CIC would be permitted to pass assets to the charity. CICs are more lightly regulated than charities but do not have the benefit of charitable status, even if their objects are entirely charitable.

Those who may want to set up a CIC are expected to be philanthropic entrepreneurs who want to do good in a form other than charity. This may be because:
CICs are identified explicitly with social enterprise. Some organizations may feel that this is more suitable than charitable status.
Members of the board of a charity may only be paid where the constitution contains such a power, and it can be considered to be in the best interests of the charity. It means that, in general, the founder of a social enterprise who wishes to be paid cannot be on the board and must give up strategic control of the organization to a volunteer board, which is often unacceptable. This limitation does not apply to CICs.
They are looking to work for community benefit with the relative freedom of the non-charitable company form to identify and adapt to circumstances, but with a clear assurance of not-for-profit distribution status.
The definition of community interest that applies to CICs is wider than the public interest test for charity.

CICs must annually provide form CIC34 as part of their annual submission to Companies House. This includes confirmation of Director remuneration and some explanation of their social impact or evidence of the social benefit that they have provided over the last financial year.

Formation and registration
Formation and registration are similar to those of any limited company. New organizations can register by filing the Form IN01 and memorandum and articles of association together with a form CIC36 signed by all their directors, explaining their community credentials, to the Registrar of Companies for England and Wales, or the Registrar for Scotland, with a fee of £35.  Since 11 March 2019, CICs can be registered online for a reduced fee of £27.

Existing companies can convert to a CIC by passing resolutions which make changes to their name and their memorandum and articles of association and by delivering to the Registrar of Companies copies of these documents, together with a fee for £35, and a form CIC37 (which is similar to a CIC36, but asks for confirmation that the company is not a charity or that permission has been obtained from the Charity Commission to convert from a charity to a CIC). The Registrar will conduct the normal checks for registration and pass the papers to the Regulator of Community Interest Companies, to determine whether the company satisfies the community interest test.

CICs cannot:
be politically motivated (regulation 3 of the Community Interest Company Regulations 2005)
be set up to serve an unduly restrictive group (rules 4 & 5)
be a company which is political party, a political campaigning organisation or a subsidiary of a political party
be a charity
carry out unlawful activities.

Regulator 
The 2004 act created the officer known as the Regulator of Community Interest Companies, who is appointed for a term of up to five years by the relevant Secretary of State – since 2016 the Secretary of State for Business, Energy and Industrial Strategy.

Louise Smyth was appointed as Regulator in September 2020; she is also (since 2017) Chief Executive and Registrar for England and Wales at Companies House.

See also
B Corporation (certification) – a global initiative
Community Contribution Companies in Canada
L3C – a similar type of legal structure in the United States
Benefit corporation in the United States
Social entrepreneurship

References

External links
 Office of the Regulator of Community Interest Companies

2005 establishments in the United Kingdom
 
Types of business entity
Social economy in the United Kingdom
United Kingdom company law